The Homewood City School District is the school system of the Birmingham, Alabama, suburb of Homewood. Homewood City Schools serve 3,907 students and employ 553 faculty and staff. The district includes three elementary schools, one middle school, and one high school.

History 
In 1970 the citizens of Homewood adopted a five mill ad valorem tax to support its own school district. The Homewood City School District was founded during the 1971-72 school year and graduated the first class out of its new building in May 1973.

Schools 
The Homewood City School District consists of five schools:
 Edgewood Elementary School
 Hall-Kent Elementary School
 Homewood High School
 Homewood Middle School
 Shades Cahaba Elementary School

Student Profile 
Homewood City Schools serve all students living within Homewood city limits. The student population is 63% white, 24% African-American, 10% Hispanic, and 3% Asian-American. Approximately 27% of students qualify for free or reduced price lunch. Six percent are English Language Learners (ELL), and 7% have Individualized Education Programs (IEPs).

Homewood City Schools have an overall graduation rate of 94%. Approximately 91% of Homewood students meet or exceed state proficiency standards in mathematics, and about 95% meet or exceed standards in reading.

References

External links 
Homewood City Schools website
Homewood City Schools on Bhamwiki

Education in Jefferson County, Alabama
School districts in Alabama
1970 establishments in Alabama
School districts established in 1970